The Wakefield Trinity Wildcats' 137th season saw them enter their eleventh Super League campaign, as well as the 2009 Challenge Cup.

Transfers
Transfers for 2009 (In)

Transfers for 2009 (Out)

Full squad

Fixtures and results

†: Game rearranged due to pitch maintenance work at the JJB Stadium during June.
‡: Game postponed in respect to the death of Wakefield player, Leon Walker, who received a fatal injury during the reserves' game. Game rearranged for 30 May 2009.

League table

Death of Leon Walker
On 22 March 2009, Leon Walker, a reserve player, collapsed in the 63rd minute of a game against Crusaders Reserves at Maesteg rugby union ground. He was airlifted to Morriston Hospital, Swansea where he was pronounced dead upon arrival. He was 20 years old at the time of his death. An inquest subsequently found that his death was the result of a rare undiagnosed heart defect, and the coroner ruled that he died of natural causes.

Walker started playing rugby league for the amateur side, the Churwell Chiefs. Walker joined the Salford City Reds in 2006 and played for the club for three years. After his rookie season he was named the Salford Reds Junior Academy Player of the Year. In 2007 Walker represented both the Yorkshire and England U18 sides.

He joined the Wakefield Trinity Wildcats in November 2008, joining their senior academy side.

Walker attended Morley High School and was a scaffolder by trade, and was the cousin and team mate of Luke Blake.

External links
 Wakefield Trinity Wildcats' official website

References

Wakefield Trinity seasons
Wakefield Trinity Wildcats season